The 1981 RTHK Top 10 Gold Songs Awards was held in 1981 for the 1980 music season.

Top 10 song awards
The top 10 songs (十大中文金曲) of 1981 are as follows.

Other awards

References
 RTHK top 10 gold song awards 1981

RTHK Top 10 Gold Songs Awards
Rthk Top 10 Gold Songs Awards, 1981
Rthk Top 10 Gold Songs Awards, 1981